

Results
Arsenal's score comes first

https://www.11v11.com/teams/arsenal/tab/matches/season/1940/

Legend

Football League First Division

League suspended due to World War II

Football League South

Selected results from the league.

Group A League table

Group C League table

Football League War Cup

References

External links
 Arsenal season-by-season line-ups

1939-40
English football clubs 1939–40 season